Mohammad Abubakar is a Pakistani politician who has been a member of the National Assembly of Pakistan since June 2022.

Political career
He was elected to the National Assembly of Pakistan from Constituency NA-240 (Korangi Karachi-II) as a candidate of Muttahida Qaumi Movement – Pakistan in a by-election held on 16 June 2022.

References

Living people
Pakistani MNAs 2018–2023
Muttahida Qaumi Movement politicians
Year of birth missing (living people)